Andrea Paolelli (born 31 July 1997) is an Italian football player who plays for Serie D club Lupa Frascati

Club career
He made his Serie C debut for Viterbese Castrense on 25 March 2017 in a game against Lucchese.

References

External links
 

1997 births
People from Viterbo
Living people
Italian footballers
Association football defenders
Serie C players
Serie D players
U.S. Viterbese 1908 players
A.S. Gubbio 1910 players
Footballers from Lazio
Sportspeople from the Province of Viterbo